Fareeda Shabbir is a Pakistani actress. She is known for her roles in dramas Ghalati, Romeo Weds Heer, Mera Dil Mera Dushman, Yeh Zindagi Hai, Saraab, Dobara and Bikhray Moti.

Early life
She was born in 1970 on 12th December in Karachi, Pakistan. She completed her education and studies from University of Karachi.

Career
Fareeda made her debut as an actress in 1990 on PTV. She was noted for her roles in dramas Pas-e-Aaina, Moam, Manjdhar, Rehnay Do and Phir Youn Love Hua. Then Fareeda appeared in dramas Aa Mere Pyar ki Khusboo, Dil Tou Kachha Hai Jee, Bubbly Ghar Se Kyun Bhaagi. She appeared in dramas series Yeh Zindagi Hai and Yeh Zindagi Hai Season 2 as Joga. Since then she appeared in dramas Saraab, Ghisi Piti Mohabbat, Ghalati, Romeo Weds Heer, Bikhray Moti and Mera Dil Mera Dushman.

Personal life
Fareeda married Raheel in 1990 but after seven years they divorced in 1997. Then she married actor Shabbir Jan. They married in 23rd September in 2001. They have two children together a son and daughter. Fareeda along with her husband Shabbir runs their own Shab's Salon & Spa.

Filmography

Television

References

External links
 
 

1970 births
20th-century Pakistani actresses
Living people
Pakistani television actresses
21st-century Pakistani actresses